Constantin Wallhäuser (born 1975 Siegen) is a German artist.

In 1992–1993, he studied at the Liverpool College of Art.
In 1997–2004, he studied at Kunstakademie Düsseldorf.

He lives and works in Berlin.

Awards
1997 Tobias Hantmann Prize
2005 	Villa Romana prize

Exhibitions
2008
23.08.08–24.08.08 Constantin Wallhäuser, Florian Neufeldt, Tina Beifuss, Lorenzo Pompa MAXIM Köln
23.08.08–24.08.08 "Don't call us – we call you" MAXIM Köln
2005
10.09.05–06.11.05 "Compilation II", Kunsthalle Düsseldorf
01.2005–04.2005 "Each Day Is Valentines Day", Jablonka-Lühn, Cologne

2004
"Villa Romana-Preisträger", Von der Heydt Museum, Wuppertal
10.12.04–23.01.05 „Alice im Aggressorland“, with Elke Nebel, Kunstraum Düsseldorf
09.2004–10.2004 Constantin Wallhäuser Jablonka Galerie, Köln 

2003
"For Believe I Can Fly", Galerie Vera Gliem, Cologne
"1st show", Galerie Eric Mathijsen, Amstelveen/Netherlands
"Ihr Kinderlein kommet", Galerie Martin Bochynek, Düsseldorf
"2nd show", Galerie Eric Mathijsen, Amstelveen/Netherlands
01.10.03–05.10.03 Art Forum Berlin 2003 Art Forum Berlin
2002
Kunstverein Düsseldorf, Bar with Max Schulze
Hotel Ufer, Düsseldorf
"ww.werwoelfe.d.teilVI – neue werung", Kunst und Kulturstiftung
Stadtsparkasse Düsseldorf

2001
"Raum114", Kunstakademie Düsseldorf
"Eine Hand voll Scheiße", Herold Klasse, John Doe, Düsseldorf
"Sly präsentiert", Plusfiliale, Düsseldorf

References

External links
Artist's website

German artists
1975 births
People from Siegen
Living people
Alumni of Liverpool College of Art
Kunstakademie Düsseldorf alumni